The Association of International Collective Management of Audiovisual Works (AGICOA) is a non-profit organization that negotiates, collects, and distributes royalties from the use of audiovisual works, whether via cable, satellite, mobile or any other similar means.

History 
Established in 1981, AGICOA operate under the terms of audiovisual copyright law set by the Berne Convention, the satellite broadcasting and cable retransmission European Directive 93/83/EEC (CABSAT 1) and the online broadcasting and retransmission European Directive 2019/789/EU (CABSAT 2).

AGICOA is set up as an Alliance of some 12 organizations in a unique partnership that enables the efficient international collective management of intellectual property rights. 

AGICOA, together with CISAC and FIAPF, is a founding partner of ISAN_IA, the International Agency which delivers the ISO standard, ISAN (International Standard Audiovisual Number), a voluntary numbering system for the identification of audiovisual works.

The AGICOA Alliance
 AGICOA, Switzerland
 AGICOA EUROPE, Luxembourg
 AGICOA EUROPE BRUSSELS, Belgium
 AGICOA GmbH, Germany
 AGICOA NORGE, Norway
 ALGOA, Luxembourg
 ANGOA, France
 APFI, Finland
 EGEDA, Spain
 FRF, Sweden,
 GEDIPE, Portugal
 ZAPA, Poland

See also
 ISAN
 AGICOA Members List

References

 AGICOA & ISAN – founding institutions
 AGICOA - Organizations in cooperation with ISO
 AGICOA - Nomination of the registration authority for ISO 15706: the ISAN foundation for the International ISAN Agency
 WIPO Expedited Arbitration for AGICOA
 AGICOA at the board of CRC
 AGICOA – New ERA (Educational Recording Agency) member
 Norwegian Film and TV Producers’ Association – Member of AGICOA
 AGICOA - MIP World - Conferences and events sponsors
 The mystery of AGICOA. Europe's best open secret.
 YouTube: Who is remunerated at AGICOA

Copyright collection societies
Organisations based in Geneva